Toney Clemons (born October 11, 1988) is a former American football wide receiver. He was drafted by the Pittsburgh Steelers with the 231st overall pick in the seventh round of the 2012 NFL Draft. He played college football at Michigan and Colorado. Because of his transfer and Colorado's move he became the first player to play in the Big Ten Conference, Big 12 Conference and Pac-12 Conference.

Professional career

Pittsburgh Steelers
Clemons was drafted by the Pittsburgh Steelers 231st overall in the seventh round of the 2012 NFL Draft.

Jacksonville Jaguars
Clemons was signed off the Steelers' practice squad by the Jacksonville Jaguars on November 26, 2012.

He was released on August 30, 2013.

San Diego Chargers
Clemons was signed by the San Diego Chargers to their practice squad on September 1, 2013. He was released on September 25, 2013.

Carolina Panthers
Clemons was signed to the Carolina Panthers practice squad on October 8, 2013. He was cut on August 24, 2014.

Personal life
Clemons’ cousin is Steve Breaston.

References

External links
Colorado Buffaloes bio
Jacksonville Jaguars bio
Pittsburgh Steelers bio
San Diego Chargers bio

1988 births
Living people
Players of Canadian football from Pittsburgh
Players of American football from Pittsburgh
American football wide receivers
Michigan Wolverines football players
Colorado Buffaloes football players
University of Colorado alumni
Pittsburgh Steelers players
Jacksonville Jaguars players
San Diego Chargers players
Carolina Panthers players